This is an episode summary of British TV comedy show The Morecambe & Wise Show, starring Morecambe and Wise. This was the first show of this title to be broadcast, and ran on BBC2 and BBC1 for a total of nine series, plus eight Christmas specials, between 1968 and 1977.

Overview
The episodes produced for the BBC between 1968 and 1977 by Eric Morecambe and Ernie Wise are generally considered to be their best output; From series two, all were written by Eddie Braben (save for the 1972 and 1976 Christmas shows which were penned by John Junkin and Barry Cryer) these programmes used a familiar format of opening spot with the duo in front of their familiar "tabs", followed by a musical guest, sketches, another musical guest followed by a scene in the fictional flat, either in bed or in the lounge greeting star guests, usually a play "What Ern Wrote" and the closing song and credits. This format was occasionally not used but was considered the "norm" during the pair's BBC years. Until 1973, unlike other shows episodes were broadcast every fortnight rather than weekly.

From 2 September 1968 until 19 September 1971, The Morecambe and Wise Show aired on BBC 2 (except for their Christmas shows which aired on BBC 1). The main reason for this was that Morecambe and Wise had moved to the BBC because they were making colour television programmes, and Lew Grade, their boss at ATV, could not transmit their show in colour on ITV, so they moved to BBC 2, the only channel who transmitted programmes in colour at the time. BBC 1 would join ITV in launching a full colour service in November 1969, but it took until 19 September 1971 for The Morecambe and Wise Show to be transferred to BBC 1.

Series One (September–October 1968)
Only BBC series written by Hills and Green. All episodes 30 minutes. 2 episodes survive in colour. 1 incomplete in colour, 4 episodes missing, and 1 has been restored.

Series Two (July–September 1969)
First series written by Eddie Braben. All episodes survive in colour. Episodes increased to 45 minutes. First appearance of Janet Webb as "the lady who comes down at the end". First use of Bring Me Sunshine.

The Morecambe & Wise Christmas Show (1969)
First Christmas special. 60 minutes duration.

Series Three (January–April 1970)
Episode six specially produced as BBC entry for Golden Rose Of Montreux and is 30 minutes; all other episodes 45 minutes. All episodes extant.

Series Four (July–October 1970)
Second series produced in 1970. All episodes 50 minutes. All episodes extant.
{| class="wikitable" width="100%"
|-
! scope="col" style="background:#89CFF0;" | No.
! scope="col" style="background:#89CFF0;" | Guests
! scope="col" style="background:#89CFF0;" | Director
! scope="col" style="background:#89CFF0;" | Writer
! scope="col" style="background:#89CFF0;" | Broadcast
! scope="col" style="background:#89CFF0;" | Viewership
{{Episode list
| EpisodeNumber   = 4.1
| Aux1                           = Janet Webb, Kenny Ball & His Jazzmen, Eric Porter, Jan Daley, Trio Athenee, Michael Ward
| DirectedBy      = John Ammonds
| WrittenBy       = Eddie Braben
| OriginalAirDate = 
| ProdCode        = ?
| ShortSummary    = A This Is Your Life segment forms the opening spot followed by a moon landing skit; Voice swap skit, then the duo visit Eric Porter in his dressing room before Tarzan’s Last Adventure; a six weeks to live skit, a bill-posting quickie, the glove puppet sketch and the monks in a James Bond spoof precede the play Wuthering Heights.
}}

|}

The Morecambe & Wise Christmas Show (1971)

The Morecambe & Wise Christmas Show (1972)
Only episode produced in 1972. First episode since 1968 not written by Eddie Braben.

Series Seven (January–March 1973)
Longest series produced by Morecambe & Wise since 1967 (Two of a Kind, Series 6). Only series produced in 1973.

The Morecambe & Wise Christmas Show (1973)

Series Eight (September–November 1974)
First regular appearance of Arthur Tolcher as the harmonica player ("Not now, Arthur")

Parkinson Takes A Christmas Look At Morecambe & Wise 1974
Not a standard Christmas special - instead a compilation presented by Michael Parkinson.

The Morecambe & Wise (Christmas) Show 1975
Only episode produced in 1975.

Series Nine (January–April 1976)
Final series produced for the BBC.

The Morecambe & Wise (Christmas) Show 1976

Eric & Ernie's Christmas Show 1977
Last Morecambe & Wise episode produced for the BBC. Ratings estimated at 21.1m.

Home media
Through the early 1980s, VHS compilations were issued by the BBC including one dedicated to the pair's Musical Extravaganzas as well as some from their later years at Thames Television titled as Eric & Ernie's Xmas Show and featuring highlights from the 1978, 1979 and 1980 seasonal specials. Reader's Digest also issued a five-volume Best Of... series of VHS cassettes in 1993 using footage from the BBC series, the first three of which featured interview footage and interlinking material from Wise, Braben and Maxin filmed especially for the tapes.  Under the Comedy Greats title, the BBC issued a compilation in 1996 which included limited edition postcards of the duo during their time at the BBC.

The first series of the show was wiped from the BBC archives and, for over ten years, only 25 minutes of one episode was known to survive; this was included on the DVD release of the complete second series in 2007. Also in 2007 the complete third series was released including the Golden Rose Of Montreux episode.  The complete set of Christmas Shows was released as a three-disc set in November 2007.  The fourth series was released on DVD in April 2008 but does not include the sixth episode of the series, which no longer existed at the time. It was recovered by Gary Morecambe, Eric's son, in 2020, and received a full colour recovery from the black and white telerecording film copy, but has yet to be released on DVD. The fifth series was released on 4 May 2009. The sixth series has been released on 3 August 2009. The seventh series was released on 3 May 2010. The eighth series was released on 5 July 2010, and the ninth series was released on 23 August 2010.

A complete box-set containing all nine series and eight Christmas specials (not included was the 1974 Michael Parkinson Christmas programme) was released on 4 October 2010.  The first series of Thames Television shows together with the first four specials was released by Network in 2010, releasing for the first time since its initial broadcast the Christmas With Morecambe & Wise'' programme hosted by David Frost on 25 December 1979. This show featured the last on-screen meetings between the duo and long-time associates Arthur Tolcher and Janet Webb with guest appearances by Glenda Jackson, Des O'Connor and Garfield Morgan.

Series 1 episode 2 was recovered as a black and white film copy from an old film storage facility in Nigeria in 2011 by archivist Philip Morris, but was suffering from a rare film decay known as "tri-acetate film degradation", and was unable to be used - footage from the reel has been in the process of recovery via use of laser cutting, x-ray scans and digital restoration since 2017.

In 2018, Morris visited an abandoned cinema in Freetown, Sierra Leone, and recovered a further two episodes from Series 1 (5 and 7), which now exist as colour restored film copies. They are rebroadcast every year on Christmas and Boxing Day. In May 2022, a new DVD release was announced entitled "Morecambe & Wise: The Lost Tapes". This featured fully coloured restorations of three of the four existing episodes of Series 1, plus as full a restoration as possible of the badly degraded episode 2, as well as the existing audio tracks of the remaining missing episodes. Additionally, a full colour restoration of the episode discovered by Gary Morecambe in 2020 is included, as well as an uncut studio recording from 1972, and various other features.

Notes

References

See also
List of Two of a Kind episodes (ATV series)
List of The Morecambe & Wise Show (1978 TV series) episodes (Thames series)

External links
Morecambe & Wise website
Eric And Ern – Keeping The Magic Alive  **Book, Film, TV Reviews, Interviews**

BBC-related lists
Lists of British comedy television series episodes
Episodes